Pir Aghach (also Romanized as Pīr Āghāch; also known as Pīr Āghāj) is a village in Gorganbuy Rural District, in the Central District of Aqqala County, Golestan Province, Iran. At the 2006 census, its population was 414, in 92 families.

References 

Populated places in Aqqala County